James Earl Gilstrap (born November 10, 1946) is an American singer, considered one of the most prolific session musicians in the industry. He is best known for his 1975 solo hit single "Swing Your Daddy", as well as singing co-lead to the theme from the TV series Good Times.

Career
Gilstrap was born November 10, 1946, in Daingerfield, Texas to Jodie and Pearlie Mae (Tolbert) Gilstrap. He joined the U.S. Navy Reserve. He began his career in the music industry when he returned from serving in the Vietnam War. Early groups he worked with include the Doodletown Pipers and The Cultures.

In the early 1970s, Gilstrap was one of the backing vocalists in Stevie Wonder's backing outfit, "Wonderlove", appearing on Wonder's albums, Talking Book and Innervisions.  Gilstrap sang the opening two lines of the Wonder song, "You Are the Sunshine of My Life" (with Lani Groves singing the next two lines). He subsequently signed a recording contract with Chelsea Records in 1975. His recording of the Kenny Nolan-penned "Swing Your Daddy" was a #4 hit in the UK Singles Chart in April 1975, and reached #10 in the U.S. Billboard Black Singles chart. The song peaked at number 64 in Australia.

Gilstrap also recorded two albums of his own during the 1970s. The first,  titled Swing Your Daddy, contained three more singles in "I'm on Fire" (covering 5000 Volts; it made #78 in the U.S.), "House of Strangers" and "Put Out the Fire". The second album, Love Talk (1977), was not as successful.

He worked as a session artist for the UK singer Elkie Brooks on her album Live and Learn (1979), among other performances.

He can be heard in a vocal performance on Quincy Jones' 1974 jazz-funk composition "Soul Saga (Song Of The Buffalo Soldier)", from Jones' Body Heat album. Gilstrap also provided the male lead vocals for the theme music to the 1970s television program Good Times. 
"I've Got You Where I Want You" (1975) was used in the soundtrack of the film Three Days of the Condor. In addition, he sang the theme song for the 1990s cartoon series TaleSpin.  More recently he did an original song for the Japanese film Survive Style 5+ entitled "A Lament".

He worked with the group Side Effect on their track "Run, Run, Run" that was released on Bell Records.

Credits

Gilstrap's recording credits include:

Aaron Neville

 Aaron Neville's Soulful Christmas (1993)
 The Tattooed Heart (1995)
 Devotion (2000)
 Believe (2003)
 20th Century Masters: The Christmas Collection (2003)
 Gospel Roots (2005)
 Christmas & Hits Duos (2008)
 I Know I've Been Changed (2010)

Al Jarreau

 Best of Al Jarreau (1996)

Al Kooper

 Championship Wrestling (1982)

Altair All-Star Choir / Jim Gilstrap / Joyce Vincent / Pam Vincent

 La La Peace Song (2018)

Amaia Montero

 Amaia Montero (2008)
 2 (2011)

Amy Grant

 A Christmas to Remember (1999)

Andy Griffith

 Just as I Am: 30 Favorite Old Time Hymns (1998)

Angela Bofill

 Something About You (1981)
 Too Tough (1983)

Anita Baker

 The Songstress (1983)
 Rapture (1986)
 The Best of Anita Baker (2002)
 Sweet Love: The Very Best of Anita Baker (2002)

Aretha Franklin

 Aretha (1980)
 Who's Zoomin' Who? (1985)
 Aretha (1986)
 Greatest Hits: 1980-1994 (1994)
 Knew You Were Waiting: The Best of Aretha Franklin 1980-1998 (2012)

Art Garfunkel

 Fate for Breakfast (1979)

B.B. King

 King of Blues: 1989 (1988)

Barbra Streisand

 Higher Ground (1997)
 Songbird (1978)

Beau Williams

 Bodacious (1984)

Bill Medley

 Right Here and Now (1982)

Bill Withers

 Making Music (1975)
 The Essential Bill Withers (2013)

Billy Cobham

 B.C. (1979)

Billy Preston / Syreeta

 Billy Preston & Syreeta (1981)

Bob Crewe

 Motivation (1977)

Bobby Lyle

 New Warrior (1977)
 The Journey (1990)

Boney James

 Boney's Funky Christmas (1996)

Booker T. Jones

 Try and Love Again (1978)
 I Want You (1981)

Boz Scaggs

 Silk Degrees (1976)
 Down Two Then Left (1977)
 Hits! (1980)
 My Time: The Anthology (1969-1997) (1997)
 The Collection: Slow Dancer/Silk Degrees/Down Two Then Left (2004)

Brainstorm

 Funky Entertainment (1979)

Brandon Burrows

 On the Move (2008)

Brownie McGhee / Sonny Terry / Sonny Terry & Brownie McGhee

 Sonny & Brownie (1973)

Bunny Hull

 Dream a World: A Child's Journey to Self-Discovery (2004)
 Music For Young Masters: Secrets Of The Heart (2007)

Candi Staton

 House of Love (1978)
 The Best of Candi Staton [Warner Bros.] (1995)
 Candi/Young Hearts Run Free (2013)
 Music Speaks Louder Than Words/House of Love (2013)

Carl Anderson

 Absence Without Love/On & On (2009)

Carrie Lucas

 Simply Carrie (1977)

Céline Dion

 Let's Talk About Love (1997)
 Let's Talk About Love/Celine Dion (2008)
 My Love: Essential Collection (2008)
 Let's Talk About Love/A New Day Has Come (2009)
 The Collection: Let's Talk About Love/Falling into You/A New Day Has Come (2009)

Christina Ashley

 Let It All Go
Christopher Franke
 Celestine Prophecy (1996)
Country Joe & Energy Crisis

 Rock N Roll from Planet Earth (1978)

Country Joe McDonald

 Classics (1989)

Country Joe McDonald / Country Joe & Energy Crisis

 Paradise with an Ocean View (1976)

Crowded House

 Crowded House (1986)
 Crowded House/Temple of Low Men (2005)

D.J. Rogers

 The Message Man: The Best of DJ Rogers (1998)

Dana Glover

 Testimony (2002)

Darlene Koldenhoven

 Inspired by a True Story

Daryle Chinn

 From the Heart (1996)

Dave Grusin

 3 Days of the Condor [Original Motion Picture Soundtrack] (1975)

Dave Koz

 Lucky Man (1993)
 Off the Beaten Path (1996)

David Foster

 The Christmas Album (1995)

David T. Walker

 David T Walker (1973)

DeBarge

 Time Will Reveal: The Complete Motown Albums (2011)

Debra Hurd

 Debra Hurd (1983)

Dee Dee Bridgewater

 Dee Dee Bridgewater (1976)
 Just Family (1977)
 Bad for Me (1979)
 Only the Best of Dee Dee Bridgewater (2009)
 Dee Dee Bridgewater [1976]/Just Family/Bad for Me/Dee Dee Bridgewater [1980] (2020)

DeLeon

 Straight from the Heart (2001)

Diana DeGarmo

 Blue Skies (2004)
 Dreams (2004)

Dianne Reeves

 Never Too Far (1990)

Dionne Warwick

 Aquarela do Brasil (1995)
 Sings Cole Porter/Aquarela do Brasil (2011)

Dirk Hamilton

 You Can Sing on the Left or Bark on the Right (1976)

Disney

 The Disney Afternoon Songbook: Music from Hit TV Shows (1990)
 The Music of Disney: A Legacy in Song (1992)
 Disney's Music from the Park (1996)
 Disney's Rock-A-Bye Baby: Soft Hits for Little Rockers (1996)
 Matrix Revolutions [Original Motion Picture Soundtrack] (2003)

Don Grusin

 Raven (1990)
 Native Land (1993)

Donald Byrd

 Thank You...For F.U.M.L. (Funking Up My Life) (1978)

Donald Byrd / Donald Byrd and 125th St.

 Donald Byrd and 125th Street, N.Y.C. (1979)

Dr. John

 Tango Palace (1979)

Elaine Norwood

 Double Blessing (2006)

Eleanor

 Jungle Wave

Elkie Brooks

 Rich Man's Woman (1975)
 Live & Learn (1979)

Elton John

 The Fox (1981)
 Duets (1993)

England Dan & John Ford Coley

 Dr. Heckle & Mr. Jive (1978)
 The Very Best of England Dan & John Ford Coley (1996)

Erich Kunzel

 The Magical Music of Disney (1995)

Eros Ramazzotti

 Todo Historias (1993)
 Tutte Storie (1993)
 Donde Hay Música (1996)
 Dove C'e Musica (1996)
 Eros (1997)
 Cosas De La Vida (Can't Stop Thinking Of You) (1998)
 Calma Apparente (2005)
 Alas y Raices (2009)
 Ali e Radici (2009)

Everlast

 Eat at Whitey's (2000)
 Love, War and the Ghost of Whitey Ford (2008)

Franky Perez

 Poor Man's Son (2003)

Funk

 Priced to Sell (1974)

Gene Page

 Lovelock! (1976)
 Close Encounters (1978)

George Benson

 Give Me the Night (1980)
 The George Benson Collection (1981)
 While the City Sleeps (1986)
 The Best of George Benson [Warner Bros.] (1995)
 Les Incontournables (2000)
 The George Benson Anthology (2000)
 The Greatest Hits of All (2003)
 Very Best of George Benson: The Greatest Hits of All (2004)
 Rhino Hi-Five: George Benson (2005)
 The Essential George Benson (2006)

George Duke

 Snapshot (1992)
 Illusions (1995)
 Best of George Duke: The Elektra Years (1997)
 Is Love Enough? (1997)
 Cool (2000)
 Face the Music (2002)
 Duke (2005)
 Ultimate George Duke (2007)
 Dukey Treats (2008)
 DreamWeaver (2013)
 George Duke Collection (2014)

Gladys Knight

 Miss Gladys Knight (1978)
 Good Woman (1991)

Greg

 Rockin' Down The Road [Bonus Tracks] (1995)

Hanne Boel

 Misty Paradise (2001)

Harold Faltermeyer

 Copout (2010)

Harry Styles

 Harry Styles (2017)

Harvey Mason

 Marching in the Street (1976)
 Groovin' You (1979)
 Sho Nuff Groovin' You: The Arista Records Anthology 1975-1981 (2017)

Henry Mancini

 "Easy Baby" (from the film 99 and 44/100% Dead)

Herbie Hancock

 Lite Me Up (1982)

Hiroshima

 Hiroshima (1979)
 Odori (1980)
 Third Generation (1983)
 Another Place (1985)
 Go (1987)
 Ongaku (1988)
 East (1989)
 Providence (1992)
 L.A. (1994)

House of Pain

 Shamrocks and Shenanigans: The Best of House of Pain and Everlast (2004)

Howard Tate

 A Portrait of Howard (2006)

Irene Cara

 Carasmatic (1987)

Irving Fields

 Irving Fields and His Trio at the Emerald Room

Jackson Browne

 Looking East (1996)

Jaco Pastorius

 The Essential Jaco Pastorius (2007)
 
 
James Ingram

 It's Your Night (1983)
 It's Real (1989)

James Newton Howard

 King Kong [Original Motion Picture Soundtrack] (2005)

James Taylor

 Dad Loves His Work (1981)
 JT/Flag/Dad Loves His Work [Box Set] (1995)

Jean Carn

 When I Find You Love/Sweet and Wonderful (2005)

Jesse Colin Young

 American Dreams (1978)

Jim Gilstrap

 Swing Your Daddy (1975)
 Love Talk (1976)
 Swing Your Daddy/Love Talk (1995)

Joe Cocker
Hymn for My Soul (2007)
Joe Sample

 Roles (1983)
 Sample This (1997)
 The Best of Joe Sample (1998)
 Introducing Joe Sample (2006)
 Rhino Hi-Five: Joe Sample

Joey Lawrence

 Joey Lawrence (1993)

John Hiatt

 Little Head (1997)

John Powell

 Ice Age: The Meltdown [Original Motion Picture Soundtrack] (2006)

Johnny Gill
Chemistry (1985)
Johnny Gill / Stacy Lattisaw
Perfect Combination (1984)
Johnny Mathis

 That's What Friends Are For/You Light Up My Life/Better Together: Duet (1997)
 Mathis on Broadway (2000)
 Johnny Mathis / Deniece Williams
 That's What Friends Are For (1978)

José Feliciano

 Just Wanna Rock 'n' Roll (1975)
 Jose Feliciano [1980] (1980)

June Pointer
Baby Sister (1983)
Kanye West

 808s & Heartbreak (2008)

Kathy Dalton
Amazing (1973)
Keith Moon (1975)
Two Sides of the Moon - 
Kelis
Kelis Was Here (2006)
Kenny G

Breathless (1992)

Breathless/At Last... The Duets Album (2012)

Kenny Loggins

Back to Avalon (1988)

The Unimaginable Life (1997)

Kenny Rankin

Silver Morning (1975)

Peaceful: The Best of Kenny Rankin (1996)

Kurt Bestor

Sketches (1997)

Larry Graham

Fired Up (1985)

Leo Sayer
Leo Sayer (1978)
Leon Haywood

 Intimate (1976)

Leonard Cohen

 Recent Songs (1979)

Les McCann

 Only The Best Of Les McCann (1974)
 Pump It Up (2002)

Linda Lewis

Woman Overboard (1977)

Linda Ronstadt

 Hasten Down the Wind (1976)
 Simple Dreams (1977)
 Living in the U.S.A. (1978)
 Greatest Hits, Volume Two (1980)
 The Linda Ronstadt Box Set (1999)
 3 for One (2000)

Lionel Richie

 Back to Front (1992)

Little Anthony & the Imperials

 You'll Never Know (2008)

Livingston Taylor

 3-Way Mirror (1978)
 Carolina Day: The Collection (1970-1980) (1998)

Luther Vandross

 Songs (1994)
 The Ultimate Luther Vandross [2001] (2001)
 The Essential Luther Vandross (2003)
 Love, Luther (2007)
 The Music of Luther Vandross (2009)
 The Box Set Series (2014)

Lynn Ahrens / Stephen Flaherty / David Newman

 Anastasia [Music From the Motion Picture] (1997)

Marilyn Scott

 Smile (1992)
 Take Me with You (1995)
 Avenues of Love (1998)
 Handpicked (2005)
 I'm in Love Once Again (2005)

Marino

 The Unexpected Alliance (2001)

Martha Davis

 Policy (1987)

Martha Reeves

 Martha Reeves (1974)

Melissa Manchester

 If My Heart Had Wings (1995)

Michael Bolton

 The One Thing (1993)
 All That Matters (1997)
 Hits 1985-1995: Best of the Best Gold (2003)
 Michael Bolton [Collector's Tin] (2009)

Michael Jackson

 Off the Wall (1979)
 HIStory: Past, Present and Future, Book I (1995)
 Greatest Hits: HIStory, Vol. 1 (2001)
 Off the Wall/Thriller (2004)
 The Ultimate Collection [Sony/Epic] (2004)
 The Essential Michael Jackson (2005)
 King of Pop (2008)
 Off the Wall/Invincible (2008)
 The Collection (2009)

Michael White

 White Night (1979)

Milira

 Back Again!!! (1992)

Minnie Riperton

 Stay in Love (1977)

Moogly

Sex & Soul: Mixed by Moog-Ly (2007)

Nancy Wilson

 Come Get to This (1975)
 This Mother's Daughter (1976)
 Forbidden Lover (1987)
 A Lady with a Song (1990)
 Greatest Hits [Sony] (1999)
 All in Love Is Fair/Come Get to This (2011)

Narada Michael Walden

 Awakening (1979)
 The Dance of Life (1979)
 Victory (1980)
 Confidence (1982)
 Looking at You, Looking at Me (1983)
 The Nature of Things (1985)
 Ecstasy's Dance: The Best of Narada Michael Walden (1996)
 Awakening/The Dance Of Life (2008)
 Looking at You, Looking at Me/The Nature of Things/Divine Em

Neil Diamond

 Beautiful Noise (1976)
 The Greatest Hits (1966-1992) (1992)
 In My Lifetime (1996)
 Classics: The Early Years/Jazz Singer/Beautiful Noise (1997)

Neil Young

 Living with War (2006)

Norman Connors

 Take It to the Limit (1980)

Olivia Newton-John

 Totally Hot (1978)

Over the Rhine

 The Long Surrender (2011)

Patrice Rushen

 Patrice (1978)
 Pizzazz (1980)
 Posh (1980)
 Now (1984)
 Anything But Ordinary (1994)
 Haven't You Heard: The Best of Patrice Rushen (1996)
 Patrice/Pizzazz/Posh (2013)
 Straight from the Heart/Now (2013)
 Remind Me: The Classic Elektra Recordings 1978-1984 (2019)

Patrick Doyle

 Rise of the Planet of the Apes (2011)

Patti Austin

 Patti Austin (1984)
 The Very Best of Patti Austin: The Singles (1969-1986) (2001)

Patti LaBelle

 Winner in You (1986)
 Be Yourself (1989)

Paul Williams

 A Little Bit of Love (1974)
 The Best of Paul Williams (2008)

Paul Young

 Crossing (1993)

Peabo Bryson

 Positive (1988)
 Through the Fire (1994)

Peabo Bryson / Roberta Flack

 Born to Love (1983)

Peggy Lee

 Let's Love (1974)

Pharez Whitted

 Mysterious Cargo (1996)

Phyllis Hyman

 Phyllis Hyman (1977)
 Goddess of Love (1983)
 The Legacy of Phyllis Hyman (1996)

Praise & Worship

 Rejoice Africa (1993)

Priscilla Ahn

 A Good Day (2008)

Pugh Rogefeldt

 Bamalama (1977)

Quincy Jones

 Body Heat (1974)
 Mellow Madness (1975)
 I Heard That! (1976)
 Roots: The Saga of an American Family (1977)
 The Dude (1981)
 Back on the Block (1989)
 From Q, With Love (1999)
 Q: The Musical Biography of Quincy Jones (2001)
 Ultimate Collection (2002)
 Summer in the city (2007)

Rachelle Ferrell

 Rachelle Ferrell (1992)

Ramsey Lewis

 Ramsey (1979)

Ray Charles

 Genius & Soul: The 50th Anniversary Collection (1997)
 Ultimate Hits Collection (1999)
 Genius Loves Company (2004)
 Forever Ray Charles (2007)

Ray Simpson

 Ray Simpson (1992)

Rick Nelson

 The Last Time Around 1970-1982 (2010)

Ricky Martin

Vuelve (1998)

Ringo Starr

 Goodnight Vienna (1974)
 Ringo the 4th (1977)

Roberta Flack

 Blue Lights in the Basement (1977)

Roberto Carlos

 Roberto Carlos (Mujer Pequena) (1992)
 Todas As Manhas (1996)

Rodney Franklin

 Skydance (1985)

Ron Kenoly

 God is Able (1994)

Ronnie Foster

 Delight (1979)

Roy Ayers

 Fever (1979)

Russ Freeman

 Sahara (1994)

Russell Hitchcock

Russell Hitchcock (1988)

Sam Cardon

Innovators [1995] (1995)

Santana

Spirits Dancing in the Flesh (1990)

Sarah Vaughan

 Songs of the Beatles (1981)

Scherrie and Susaye
Partners (1979)
Seals & Crofts

 Takin' It Easy (1978)

Side Effect

 Effective (1973)
 Side Effect/What You Need (2002)

Siedah Garrett

 Kiss of Life (1988)

Stacy Lattisaw

 Let Me Be Your Angel (1980)
 With You (1981)
 Sneakin' Out (1982)
 Sixteen (1983)
 The Very Best of Stacy Lattisaw (1998)

Stanley Clarke

 Time Exposure (1984)
 Guitar & Bass (2004)

Stanley Clarke / George Duke

 3 (1990)
 The Clarke/Duke Project, Vols. 1-3 (2010)

Stanley Turrentine

 Have You Ever Seen the Rain (1975)
 Betcha (1980)
 On a Misty Night (2002)

Starship
No Protection (1987)
No Protection/Love Among The Cannibals (1987)
Stephen Sinclair

 A+ (1977)

Stevie Wonder
Talking Book (1972)
Innervisions (1973)
 Fulfillingness' First Finale (1974)
 Original Musiquarium I (1982)
 The Definitive Collection (2002)

Susaye Greene

 No Fear Here (2002)

Syreeta

 Syreeta (1972)
 One to One (1977)
 Set My Love in Motion (1981)
 Syreeta/Stevie Wonder Presents Syreeta (2004)

Teddy Pendergrass

 Truly Blessed (1991)

The Blackbyrds

 Night Grooves: The Blackbyrds' Greatest Hits (1978)
 Action/Better Days (1994)
 City Life/Unfinished Business (1994)

The Brothers Johnson

 Look Out for #1 (1976)
 Right on Time (1977)
 Light Up the Night (1980)
 Winners (1981)

The Jackson 5

 The Jacksons: An American Dream (1992)
 Original Album Classics (2008)
 Triumph/Destiny (2009)

The Jacksons

 Triumph (1980)
 The Best Remixes (1998)

The Party

 The Party (1990)

The Rippingtons

 The Best of the Rippingtons (1997)

The Simpsons

 Testify (2007)

Thelma Houston

 I've Got the Music in Me (1975)

Tom Scott

 Target (1983)

Toots Thielemans

 Verve Jazz Masters '59: Toots Thielemans (1996)

Tour De 4force1

 Quiet Moon

Tower of Power

 Direct (1981)

Tracy Nelson

 Tracy Nelson (1974)

Vanessa Rubin

 Vanessa Rubin Sings (1995)

Wayne Henderson

 Living on a Dream (1978)

Whitney Houston

 Whitney (1987)
 The Collection (2009)

Willy DeVille
Big Easy Fantasy
Backstreets of Desire (1994)
Loup Garou (1996)
Wilton Felder

 Inherit the Wind (1980)

See also
List of performers on Top of the Pops

Notes

External links
Biography at Soulwalking.co.uk
Full Career Credits at AllMusic.com

1946 births
American session musicians
American male singers
Singers from Texas
United States Navy personnel of the Vietnam War
People from Daingerfield, Texas
Living people
20th-century African-American male singers
United States Navy sailors
United States Navy reservists
21st-century African-American people
African-American United States Navy personnel
African Americans in the Vietnam War